The Lebanese Baptist Evangelical Convention is a Baptist Christian denomination in Lebanon. It is affiliated with the Baptist World Alliance. The headquarters is in Beirut.

History
The Convention has its origins in the founding of the first Baptist church in Beirut in 1895 by the American pastor Said Jureidini. It was officially founded in 1955 by various churches. In 1960, it founded the Arab Baptist Theological Seminary in Mansourieh. According to a denomination census released in 2020, it claimed 32 churches and 1,600 members.

References

External links
Official Website 	

Baptist denominations in Asia
Evangelicalism in Lebanon
Christian organizations established in 1955
Baptist denominations established in the 20th century
1955 establishments in Lebanon